Clive Barker's Nightbreed: The Interactive Movie is a 1990 arcade adventure video game developed by Impact Software and published by Ocean Software on Atari ST and DOS. It is based on Clive Barker's movie Nightbreed, which in turn is based on Barker's novella Cabal. It was originally supposed to be part of a trilogy, alongside Clive Barker's Nightbreed: The Action Game and an ultimately-unreleased RPG.

Plot and gameplay 
The player takes the role of Aaron Boone, who must stop the Earth Police from destroying a utopian planet named Midian.

The game is split into many - mostly arcade-based - sequences, which replay scenes from the film in an interactive way.

Development
To promote the release of Nightbreed: The Interactive Movie, Ocean Software and Image Animation ran a contest in The One magazine, where a randomly selected winner who gave the correct answer to three trivia questions received an autographed set of books by Clive Barker, as well as the mask used for Doctor Decker in the film.

Reception 

Nightbreed: The Interactive Movie received mixed reviews from critics. The One deemed it one of the more competent arcade adventures available. Amiga Action felt the game had a lot of wasted potential. Amiga User International noted that Cinemaware added extra interactivity to their games after being criticized, and hoped Impact did the same. Amiga Computing praised the game's range of graphics, but disliked its gameplay. ST Format noted the title's unique approach to the licence.

References

External links 

Clive Barker's Nightbreed: The Interactive Movie at Hall of Light Amiga database

1990 video games
Arcade video games
Adventure games
Atari ST games
Amiga games
Dark fantasy video games
DOS games
Video games based on films
Works by Clive Barker
Ocean Software games
Video games developed in the United Kingdom